Xavier Gigandet (born 15 August 1966) is a retired Swiss alpine skier who competed in the 1992 Winter Olympics.

External links
 

1966 births
Living people
Swiss male alpine skiers
Olympic alpine skiers of Switzerland
Alpine skiers at the 1992 Winter Olympics
Place of birth missing (living people)